Bert Butler may refer to:

Bert Butler (footballer, born 1889) (1889–1953),  Australian rules footballer for St Kilda
Bert Butler (footballer, born 1915) (1915–1999), Australian rules footballer for Carlton
Bert Butler, founder of Tito's Vodka

See also
Albert Butler (disambiguation)
Bertram Butler, Canadian diplomat
Robert Butler (disambiguation)
Herbert Butler (disambiguation)
Hubert Butler, Irish writer